"Lullaby" is a song by Canadian rock band Nickelback. It was released in February 2012 as the fourth single from their seventh studio album, Here and Now.

Music video
The music video for "Lullaby", directed by Nigel Dick, was shot in a factory in California on January 28, 2012. It premiered on March 22 on VH1.

The video features a constructed narrative interspersed with shots of the band performing in a cavernous building. It also returns to the emotionally wrenching stories the band had previously used in music videos for songs such as "Too Bad", "Someday", "Never Gonna Be Alone" and "Far Away". In the story a pregnant woman is rushed down a hospital corridor, ready to give birth. The baby is soon delivered, but the new mother dies moments later. Now left to raise his child alone, the father (played by Justin James Hughes) struggles to keep his life together. One day as he settles the child down, his phone slips from his pocket, and he finds a video of his wife that was shot while she was heavily pregnant. After showing it to the child, he feels confident enough to raise the child alone, and crumples up the adoption pamphlet he'd picked up before leaving the hospital.

A performance-only version of the video was also distributed amongst other channels, such as Kerrang! TV in the United Kingdom, that remove the narrative altogether.

Track listing
CD Single (RR 3618-2)
"Lullaby" 3:48
"If Today Was Your Last Day" 4:08

Promo CD Single (PRO16951)
"Lullaby" (Pop Mix Edit) 3:28
"Lullaby" (Pop Mix) 3:38
"Lullaby" (Album Version) 3:48

Charts

Weekly charts

Year-end charts

Certifications

Personnel
Chad Kroeger – lead vocals
Mike Kroeger – bass
Daniel Adair – drums, backing vocals
Ryan Peake – piano, backing vocals
Rob Dawson - acoustic guitar

References

2012 singles
Nickelback songs
Number-one singles in Poland
Roadrunner Records singles
Songs written by Chad Kroeger
Songs written by Craig Wiseman
Songs written by Chris Tompkins
Songs written by Rodney Clawson
Songs about suicide
Song recordings produced by Joey Moi
2011 songs
Rock ballads
Pop ballads
2010s ballads
Music videos directed by Nigel Dick